Crystal Alyssia Soubrier (born July 3, 1992) is an American soccer player for the Portland Thorns FC of the National Women's Soccer League (NWSL), the highest division of women's professional soccer in the United States, and the United States women's national soccer team. She first appeared for the United States national team during an international friendly against Scotland on February 13, 2013. She has since made more than 100 total appearances for the team.

Dunn played collegiate soccer with the North Carolina Tar Heels from 2010 to 2013 and was awarded the 2012 Hermann Trophy for best college soccer player. She was a member of the team that won the 2012 FIFA U-20 Women's World Cup in Japan. Following her collegiate career, Dunn was selected first overall by the Washington Spirit in the 2014 NWSL College Draft that took place on January 17, 2014. The following year, she won the NWSL Most Valuable Player and the Golden Boot awards, becoming the youngest player to win both awards, at age 23.

Early life 
Born in New Hyde Park, New York, to Vincent and Rhonda Dunn, Crystal was raised with her brother Henry in Rockville Centre, New York
where she attended South Side High School. At South Side, she was a four-year starter as forward and midfielder and team captain in 2008 and 2009. She lost only two matches in three seasons at South Side and helped lead her team to New York state championships in 2006, 2007 and 2009. In 2008, she was competing at the 2008 FIFA U-17 Women's World Cup in New Zealand. As captain of the team in 2009, she scored four goals in the first 20 minutes of the state championship game.

Dunn scored 46 goals and had 35 assists in three high school seasons, missing the 2008 season due to national team commitments. She was a highly decorated high school player earning Parade All-American and New York Gatorade Player of the Year. She earned First-team All-State and All-Long Island honors in 2006, 2007 and 2009. As a freshman, sophomore and senior, she was an All-New York First Team and All-Long Island team selection. In 2009, she was named 2009 NSCAA, ESPNRise and Parade High School All-America. The teams she played on in 2007 and 2009 went undefeated and were ranked number one in the nation by the NSCAA.

As a senior, she was named Newsday Long Island Player of the Year, Nassau County Class A Player of the Year, New York Sportswriters Class A Player of the Year, BigAppleSoccer.com Youth Player of the Year and was the winner of the Mike Clark Award for the best all-around athlete in Nassau County. In addition to her high school experience, Dunn played with the club teams, Albertson Fury, the RVC Tornadoes, and the RVC Power (with whom she won a state title).

University of North Carolina, 2010–2013
Dunn attended the University of North Carolina, Chapel Hill and majored in sociology. As a freshman in 2010, Dunn started 23 matches for a total of 1,929 minutes, playing the full 90 minutes 18 times. She was the team's leading player in points (26), including nine goals and eight assists. She scored four goals during the NCAA Division I Women's Soccer Championship, including a match-winner against Jackson State, a goal against Notre Dame, and two goals in a 3–1 win over James Madison in the second round of the tournament. Her accolades during her first year season included Soccer America Freshman of the Year, 2010 NSCAA first-team All-America honoree, Second-team Soccer America MVP selection, and First-team All-ACC. She was the first freshman ever to win the ACC Defensive Player of the Year award and was a semi-finalist for the 2010 Missouri Athletic Club Hermann Trophy.

As a sophomore in 2011, Dunn started in 19 matches, missing only one while she was training with the United States under-20 women's national soccer team. She scored three goals and made six assists during the season. She was named third-team All-America and first-team All-Southeast Region by the NSCAA. She was also named to the first-team All-ACC and was named to the Top Drawer Soccer National Team of the Week three times.

During her junior season in 2012, Dunn missed the non-conference phase of the 2012 college season while playing for the United States under-20 women's national soccer team at the 2012 FIFA U-20 Women's World Cup in Japan. Following her return, she helped lead the Tar Heels to win the NCAA Women's Soccer Championship. During the tournament's quarter-final, Dunn scored both goals in a 2–1 win against top-seed team BYU, including a match-winning "golden" goal within four minutes of the end of the second overtime. She also saved her team from losing to BYU when she headed the ball away from the Tar Heels' goal line in the first overtime. Dunn was named the 2013 Hermann Trophy winner as well as the ACC Athlete of the Year and ACC Defender of the Year. Dunn was an All-ACC selection for the third straight year and an ESPY Awards finalist. She also was awarded the 2012 Honda Award for Soccer.

During her senior-year season in 2013, Dunn scored the first hat-trick of her collegiate career, ending a two-match losing streak for the Tar Heels by defeating the Miami Hurricanes 4–0. She was the team's top scorer with 14 goals, including six match-winning goals. Dunn was named ACC Offensive Player of the Year, NSCAA All-American and First-team All-ACC for the fourth consecutive year. She was a Hermann Trophy finalist and a Honda Award nominee.

Club career

Washington Spirit, 2014–2017
In January 2014, Washington Spirit selected Dunn with the first overall pick in the 2014 College Draft for the 2014 season of the National Women's Soccer League. She made 19 starts in her 22 appearances for the Spirit during the 2014 season. The team finished fourth during the regular season with a  record securing a place in the playoffs. During the semi-final, the Spirit were defeated by regular season champions Seattle Reign FC 2–1 on August 31 in Seattle.

Dunn returned to the Spirit for the 2015 season. On April 26, 2015, she scored two goals as a defender in a match against Sky Blue FC, helping the Spirit win 3–1. She was subsequently named NWSL Player of the Week for week 2 of the season. On August 1, 2015, Dunn scored the franchise's first hat trick, scoring three goals in the first half of the Spirit's victory over the visiting Houston Dash. She finished the month with six goals, earning her the league Player of the Month award. Dunn finished the regular season with a league-leading 15 goals, giving her the 2015 NWSL Golden Boot, and won the league Most Valuable Player award. She became the youngest player to win both awards at age 23 and broke the league record with her 0.77 goals-per-game average. She has said that being left off the national team for the 2015 FIFA Women's World Cup gave her extra motivation in the league.

Dunn returned for her third season in 2016, scoring four goals and notching a career-high five assists. Two of her four goals were the two Spirit goals scored in the team's first-ever appearance in the NWSL Championship, which was won on penalties by the Western New York Flash after a 2–2 draw.

Chelsea, 2017–2018

On January 3, 2017, Dunn joined FA WSL 1 club Chelsea. On March 19, she scored her first goal just 12 minutes into her first competitive appearance for the club, in a 7–0 FA Cup win over Doncaster Rovers Belles. She made her first appearance in the FA WSL in April, scoring her first league goal in a 6–0 victory over Yeovil Town. At the beginning she played as a striker for Chelsea, but switched to the wing-back position. During her time at Chelsea, Dunn scored five goals in 20 appearances in all competitions and helped Chelsea win the FA WSL Spring Series. She also helped the club reach the quarter-finals in the 2017–18 UEFA Women's Champions League, marking the first time they reached that stage of the competition. Dunn enjoyed her time at Chelsea, and even named one of her adopted chickens after the club, but made the decision to return to the United States so that the national team staff could see her play more.

North Carolina Courage, 2018–2020

After a year in England, it was planned that Dunn would return to North America with the deal of a trade with Washington Spirit for two of North Carolina Courage's players at the time, Taylor Smith and Ashley Hatch. The Spirit retained the League rights after Chelsea signed Dunn back in January 2017. This move was confirmed by Chelsea on February 25, 2018.

She made her first appearance for the North Carolina Courage in a 1–0 win over Portland Thorns FC, in the opening game of the 2018 NWSL season. Dunn was named Player of the Week twice in the 2018 NWSL season, for weeks 8 and 13. She was named Player of the Month for the month of June. Dunn appeared in 22 regular season games for the Courage, scoring eight goals, helping North Carolina win the NWSL Shield. The Courage broke multiple season records including most goals scored, most wins, and most points. Dunn was named to the 2018 NWSL Best XI. Dunn was in the starting lineup for the semi-final game against the Chicago Red Stars, in which North Carolina won 2–0 and advanced to the Championship Game. She was in the starting lineup for the final, which North Carolina won 3–0 over the Portland Thorns.

Portland Thorns, 2020–
On October 22, 2020, Crystal Dunn was traded to OL Reign in exchange for Casey Murphy and $140,000 in allocation money. Later that day, she was traded to the Portland Thorns in exchange for an international roster slot, a 2022 first round draft pick, and $250,000 in allocation money.

International career

Youth national teams

Dunn has competed on behalf of the United States in various national youth teams from 2008 through 2012, including at the 2008 FIFA U-17 Women's World Cup. She played in 14 international matches for the U-20 national team in 2010 before playing in every minute of the U.S.' five matches at the 2012 FIFA U-20 Women's World Cup, in which they won. She competed at the 2010 FIFA U-20 Women's World Cup in Germany and was a member of the team that won the 2012 FIFA U-20 Women's World Cup in Japan.

Senior national team

On January 22, 2013, Dunn received her first call-up to the senior team's training camp, by the newly appointed coach Tom Sermanni. Dunn made her debut for the team, on February 13, against Scotland in a friendly match; and was placed on the roster for 2013 Algarve Cup.

Dunn made her first Algarve Cup appearance for the senior team during the team's first match in the tournament on March 6, 2013, against Iceland. She started the match at left back and played for the full 90 minutes. The United States defeated Iceland 3–0. Dunn earned her third cap with the senior team during the final match of the tournament against Germany. The United States clinched the tournament championship after defeating Germany 2–0.

In October 2014, Dunn was dropped from the national team roster ahead of the 2014 CONCACAF Women's Championship, which served as the qualifying tournament for the 2015 FIFA Women's World Cup. Dunn returned from injury in December 2014 and traveled with the team to Brazil, but did not play.

Dunn was named to the roster for February 2015 friendlies against France and England, and made a substitute appearance against England. February 2015, Dunn was named to the 2015 Algarve Cup roster, but did not play during the tournament. Dunn was named to the preliminary roster for the 2015 FIFA Women's World Cup, but surprisingly did not make the final squad of 23.

In September 2015, Dunn was added to the roster for the national team's Women's World Cup victory tour prior to the September 17 match against Haiti, becoming the first player not on the World Cup roster to join the tour. She made her first start of 2015 against Haiti and earned her first cap since the England friendly. She recorded her first career national team assists, both on Carli Lloyd's goals, and scored her first national team goal in the final moments of the match.

Dunn played in the national team's opening game of the 2016 CONCACAF Women's Olympic Qualifying Championship, scoring her fifth international goal in the 5–0 victory over Costa Rica. In the third group match vs Puerto Rico, Dunn was tied for the most goals scored by a U.S. player, netting five goals and one assist.

During their first match of March 2019, each national team player wore a jersey with the name of a woman they were honoring on the back; Dunn chose the name of Serena Williams.

On February 7, 2020, Dunn played her 100th match for the United States in a 4–0 win against Mexico. Dunn was the only American player to start in all six matches at the 2020 Summer Olympics in Japan and played all but 16 minutes at the tournament helping the team win bronze.

In popular culture
Dunn has been featured in Self Magazine. In 2016, she starred with teammates Hope Solo and Megan Rapinoe in a docu-series called Keeping Score broadcast by Fullscreen. The episodes follow the athletes as they prepare for the 2016 Summer Olympics and address issues such as equal pay and racism.

Personal life
Dunn married Pierre Soubrier in December 2018. They met when she was playing for the NWSL's Washington Spirit, where he was working as an athletic trainer. Soubrier's presence in Portland, where he is head trainer for the Portland Thorns, contributed to Dunn's desire to get traded to Portland.  Together, they have five chickens (Quinn, Juke, Chelsea, Toulouse, and Rocky), as well as three cats.

On November 11, 2021, Dunn announced that she and Soubrier were expecting their first child together; baby Marcel Jean was born on May 20, 2022.

Career statistics

Club summary

Notes

International

International summary

International goals

Honors

University of North Carolina
 NCAA Women's Soccer Championship: 2012
Honda Sports Award 2012–13
Chelsea
 FA WSL Spring Series: 2017

North Carolina Courage
NWSL Champions: 2018, 2019
NWSL Shield: 2018, 2019

Portland Thorns
 NWSL Challenge Cup: 2021
 International Champions Cup: 2021
 NWSL Championship: 2022
United States U20
 FIFA U-20 Women's World Cup: 2012
 CONCACAF Women's U-20 Championship: 2012
United States
 FIFA Women's World Cup: 2019
 CONCACAF Women's Championship: 2018
 Olympic Bronze Medal: 2020
 CONCACAF Women's Olympic Qualifying Tournament: 2016; 2020
 SheBelieves Cup: 2016; 2018; 2020, 2021; 2023
 Tournament of Nations: 2018
 Algarve Cup: 2015
Individual
 Hermann Trophy: 2012
 ACC Player of the Year: 2012
 ACC Defensive Player of the Year: 2010
 ACC Offensive Player of the Year: 2013
 Soccer America Player of the Year Award: 2012
 Honda Sports Award: 2012
 NWSL Player of the Week: 2015 (Weeks 3, 8, 11, 16, 18, 20), 2018 (weeks 8, 13)
 NWSL Player of the Month: August 2015, June 2018
 NWSL Most Valuable Player: 2015
 NWSL Best XI: 2015, 2018
 NWSL Second XI: 2016, 2019
 NWSL Golden Boot: 2015 (15 goals)
 CONCACAF Women's Olympic Qualifying Tournament Golden Boot: 2016 (6 goals)
 IFFHS Women's World Team: 2019
CONCACAF Women's Championship Best XI: 2018
CONCACAF Women's Olympic Qualifying Tournament Best XI: 2020
CONCACAF Player of the Year: 2021
FIFA U-20 Women's World Cup All-star team: 2010

See also
 List of most expensive association football transfers
 NWSL federation players
 List of United States women's national soccer team hat-tricks
 List of American and Canadian soccer champions
 List of foreign FA Women's Super League players
 List of University of North Carolina at Chapel Hill Olympians
 List of University of North Carolina at Chapel Hill alumni

References

Match reports

Further reading
 Grainey, Timothy (2012), Beyond Bend It Like Beckham: The Global Phenomenon of Women's Soccer, University of Nebraska Press, 
 Lisi, Clemente A. (2010), The U.S. Women's Soccer Team: An American Success Story, Scarecrow Press, 
 Murray, Caitlin (2019), The National Team: The Inside Story of the Women Who Changed Soccer, Abrams,  
 Rapinoe, Megan (2020), One Life, Penguin, 
 Walters, Meg (2019), World Cup Women: Megan, Alex, and the Team USA Soccer Champs, Simon and Schuster,

External links

 
 US Soccer player profile
 US Soccer player profile
 Washington Spirit player profile
 University of North Carolina player profile
 Chelsea L.F.C. profile
 

1992 births
Living people
American women's soccer players
North Carolina Tar Heels women's soccer players
United States women's international soccer players
African-American women's soccer players
People from New Hyde Park, New York
National Women's Soccer League players
Washington Spirit players
Parade High School All-Americans (girls' soccer)
Soccer players from New York (state)
Women's association football defenders
Women's association football fullbacks
Women's association football midfielders
Footballers at the 2016 Summer Olympics
Footballers at the 2020 Summer Olympics
Women's Super League players
Chelsea F.C. Women players
Expatriate women's footballers in England
American expatriate sportspeople in England
Washington Spirit draft picks
United States women's under-20 international soccer players
North Carolina Courage players
Hermann Trophy women's winners
South Side High School (Rockville Centre) alumni
Sportspeople from Nassau County, New York
People from Rockville Centre, New York
2019 FIFA Women's World Cup players
FIFA Women's World Cup-winning players
FIFA Century Club
American expatriate women's soccer players
Olympic bronze medalists for the United States in soccer
Medalists at the 2020 Summer Olympics
21st-century African-American sportspeople
21st-century African-American women
Portland Thorns FC players